An irritation fibroma is a fibrous nodule of the oral cavity, often considered to be a reactive hyperplasia secondary to trauma or other local sources of irritation.

References

Oral mucosal pathology